Edward Harry Beecher was an American professional baseball player. He played as an outfielder in Major League Baseball between 1887 and 1891, for five teams in three leagues.

In 1887, Beecher played for the Pittsburgh Alleghenys of the National League. In 1889, he played for the NL's Washington Nationals.  In 1890, he moved to the Players' League and the Buffalo Bisons. Finally, in 1891, he split the season between two American Association teams, the Washington Statesmen and the Philadelphia Athletics.

Sources

Major League Baseball outfielders
Pittsburgh Alleghenys players
Washington Nationals (1886–1889) players
Buffalo Bisons (PL) players
Washington Statesmen players
Philadelphia Athletics (AA 1891) players
Trenton (minor league baseball) players
Hartford (minor league baseball) players
Hartford Babies players
Bridgeport Giants players
Newburyport Clamdiggers players
Hartford Dark Blues (minor league) players
Wilkes-Barre Barons (baseball) players
Albany Senators players
Syracuse Stars (minor league baseball) players
New Haven Nutmegs players
Hartford Bluebirds players
Baseball players from Connecticut
1860 births
1935 deaths
19th-century baseball players